Ljungström is a Swedish family originating from Jönköping County, Småland, through the bailiff Johan Liungström (floruit 1716, died circa 1730).

Members in selection 
 Johan Patrik Ljungström (1784–1859), jeweler
 Jonas Patrik Ljungström (1827–1898), cartographer
 Georg Ljungström (1861–1930), poet
 Oscar Ljungström (1868–1943), engineer, armed forces officer
 Birger Ljungström (1872–1948), industrialist
 Fredrik Ljungström (1875–1964), industrialist
 Gunnar Ljungström (1905–1999), technical designer
 Astrid Ljungström (1905–1986), journalist
 Olof Ljungström (1918–2013), engineer

See also
 Axel Ljungströms Fabriks AB
 Ljungström air preheater
 Ljungström locomotive
 Ljungström method
 Ljungström turbine
 Ljungström sailboat
 Ljungström rig
 Ljungström Engine Syndicate Limited
 Ljungström Steam Turbine Co.
 Ljungström Swedish Turbine Manufacturing Co. (STAL)
 Stal-Laval Turbin
 Asea Stal

References